Mamadou Diagna Ndiaye (born 10 February 1949, Senegal) has been a member of the International Olympic Committee (IOC) since 2015.

Education
Ndiaye studied law in Dakar, Paris and Brussels and also attended the CFBP (Professional banking school) in Paris.

Career
After completing his studies, Ndiaye worked as a proxyholder at the National Economic Development Bank in Senegal and was a financial advisor to the Senegalese Embassy in Paris. He was a special advisor to the Secretary General of the Organisation of the Petroleum Exporting Countries (OPEC) in Vienna, as well as to the President of Senegal, Abdou Diouf, for economic and financial affairs.
Ndiaye was director of the Attijariwafa Bank in Senegal, as well as chairman of the audit committee of the Attijariwafa Bank in Morocco. He was also the special advisor to the President and CEO of the Attijariwafa financial group, Mohamed El Kettani.

Sports career
Ndiaye played tennis and represented the Sporting Club Tennis of Dakar and the Tennis Club of the University of Dakar in various tournaments.
He was manager of the Dakar University Tennis Club and the Dakar Olympic Club. Ndiaye was president of the Senegalese Tennis Foundation, the African Tennis Confederation, as well as the Senegalese Football Federation and the Senegalese National Olympic Committee.
From 2002 until 2013, he was a member of the Sport and Environment Commission, where he was then advisor from 2014 to 2015. In the International Relations Commission, he was a member in 2014, and advisor in 2015. He became a member of the IOC in 2015, where he was a part of the Public Affairs and Social Development through Sports Commission, as well as the Audit Committee from 2016 to 2017.

Awards
Ndiaye has received various awards, including the Order of Merit and Legion of Honour from France, the Officer of the National Order of the Lion from Senegal, the Commander of the Order of Isabella the Catholic from Spain, and the Order of Ouissam Alaouite from Morocco.

References

International Olympic Committee members
Pakistani sports executives and administrators
Serbian wrestlers
Polo players
1946 births
2020 deaths
Alumni of the University of Oxford
Alumni of the University of Manchester
Recipients of orders, decorations, and medals of Senegal